Trikala is a city in northwestern Thessaly, Greece, and the capital of the Trikala regional unit. The city straddles the Lithaios river, which is a tributary of Pineios. According to the Greek National Statistical Service, Trikala is populated by 81,355 inhabitants (2011), while in total the Trikala regional unit is populated by 131,085 inhabitants (2011).

Trikala is a lively Greek city with picturesque monuments and old neighborhoods with traditional architecture. The city is near Meteora and also near the mountain range of south Pindus, where there are many destinations (i.e. Pyli's stone bridge, Elati, Pertouli, Palaiokarya's stone bridge and waterfall, Pertouli Ski Center etc.).

Name
The name Trikala appears in the Byzantine period. In Ottoman Turkish it was known as Tirhala.

History

Antiquity

The region of Trikala has been inhabited since prehistoric times. The first indications of permanent settlement have been uncovered in the cave of Theopetra, and date back to approx. 49,000 BC. Neolithic settlements dating back to 6,000 BC have been uncovered in Megalo Kefalovriso and other locations.

The city of Trikala is built on the ancient city of Trikka or Trikke, which was founded around the 3rd millennium BC and took its name from the nymph Trikke, daughter of Peneus, or according to others, daughter of the river god Asopus. The ancient city was built at a defensive location in between the local hill and the river Lithaios. The city became an important center in antiquity and it was considered to be the birthplace and main residence of the healing god Asclepius. The city exhibited one of the most important and ancient of Asclepius' healing temples, called asclepieia. The city is mentioned in Homer's Iliad as having participated in the Trojan War with thirty ships under Asclepius' sons Machaon and Podalirius. In the Mycenean period, the city was the capital of a kingdom, and later it constituted the main center of the Thessalian region of Estaiotis, which occupied roughly the territory of the modern Trikala Prefecture.

In historical times, the city of Trikke and the surrounding area experienced prosperity. It fell to the Achaemenid Persians in 480 BC, while ten years later it joined the Thessalian monetary union. In 352 BC it was united with the Macedonia of Philip II. The city became a location of hard battles between Macedonia and Rome. While Philip V of Macedon and his son Perseus tried to keep the city, after 168 BC it fell to the Roman Republic.

Middle Ages 

While the area was considered to be firmly under the rule of the Byzantine Empire, it was invaded nevertheless by a succession of  raiders and nomadic tribes. Some of these tribes that raided the area include: Goths (396), Huns (447), Slavs (577), Bulgarians (986-1000), Normans (1082/3), Catalans (1309–1311).

The current name of Trikala first appears in the 11th-century Strategikon of Kekaumenos, where "Trikalitan Vlachs" are mentioned, and then in the early 12th-century Alexiad of Anna Komnene. Later in the century, the Arab traveller and geographer al-Idrisi recorded the town as "an important agrarian center with abundant vineyards and gardens" (T.E. Gregory).

After the dissolution of the Byzantine state by the Fourth Crusade in 1204, Trikala does not appear to have fallen into Frankish hands, but became part of the Despotate of Epirus. Epirote rule lasted until 1259, when the town was taken without resistance by the Empire of Nicaea (after 1261 the renewed Byzantine Empire) following the Battle of Pelagonia. In the early 14th century the town was the capital of a semi-independent domain under the sebastokrator Stephen Gabrielopoulos, which extended across much of western Thessaly and Macedonia. After his death in 1332/3 the city, along with most of Gabrielopoulos' lands, was seized by the Epirote ruler John II Orsini, but he was in turn expelled and the area incorporated into the Byzantine Empire by Andronikos III Palaiologos.

In 1348, Thessaly was conquered by Stephen Dushan and incorporated into the newly established Serbian Empire. The Serbian general Preljub was made the region's governor, and established himself at Trikala. In 1359, Dushan's half-brother Symeon Uroš established his court at Trikala, and in 1366/7 he founded the Meteora monasteries nearby. Symeon was succeeded by his son John Uroš, and he in turn by the local magnates Alexios Angelos Philanthropenos and Manuel Angelos Philanthropenos, who ruled until the Ottoman conquest of Thessaly in 1393/4.

Ottoman period 

Under Ottoman rule, the city was called Tırhala. Its fortunes in the early period of Ottoman rule are unclear: it is reported as being part of a large sanjak under Ahmed, the son of Evrenos Bey, but in the early 15th century it formed part of the domain of Turahan Bey, who brought in Muslim settlers and granted privileges to the local Greek population. Turahan and his son and successor, Ömer Bey, erected many buildings in the city, helping it, in the words of the historian Alexandra Yerolimpos, to "[acquire] the appearance of a typical Ottoman town, with mosques, medreses, a hammam, imaret, khan and karwansaray extending beyond the citadel and the Varoussi (Varosh) quarter which remained Christian".

As the administrative center of the local province (the Sanjak of Trikala), the city attracted Muslim immigrants and had large Muslim and Jewish communities: in the 1454/5 census, the city had 2,453 inhabitants (251 Muslim families and 9 widows, and 212 Christian families and 73 widows); in 1506, the city numbered 3,100 inhabitants, with 260 Muslim, 310 Christian and 19 Jewish families; in 1520/38, the number had risen to 301 Muslim, 343 Christian, and 181 Jewish families. The city also became an important intellectual center during these years (1543-1854) with the Trikke School (and later Greek School), where famous intellectuals of the time, such as Dionysius the Philosopher, taught. Christian children from Trikala also became Janissaries. According to the 1603-4 "eşkal defter" Christian boys from the villages around the town were included in the batch that the Turnacıbaşı, the Chief collection officer levied.

The 17th-century Ottoman traveller Evliya Çelebi reports that the city had 2,300 houses divided into sixteen Muslim and eight Christian quarters (mahalla); eight mosques, of which only the city's main mosque, the Osman Shah Mosque built by Mimar Sinan, survives today; four hammams; six tekkes; and the probably exaggerated number of 1,000 shops, although Evliya curiously does not mention the city's impressive bezesten (covered market) which was demolished in the early 20th century. The city was largely burned down in a great fire in 1749, a destruction repeated by Albanian irregulars following an abortive uprising by the local Christian population during the Orlov Revolt. Despite the destruction, its population seems to have remained the same, ca. 25,000, until the outbreak of the Greek Revolution in 1821. By 1840, it reportedly had only 10,000 inhabitants, with the last Ottoman census in 1877/8 listing 25,000 inhabitants for the entire sanjak of Trikala.

Modern period

On 23 August 1881 with the Treaty of Constantinople between the Ottoman Empire and the Kingdom of Greece, the city passed in Greek sovereignty, along with the rest of Thessaly. It became occupied again by Ottoman forces briefly during the Greco-Turkish War of 1897. In the years that followed, Trikala played a fundamental role in the rural workers' mobilizations, in the early 20th century, against the Thessalian landlords. Trikala eventually became the city that the first Agricultural Cooperative of Greece was founded, in 1906.

Historically, Trikala and its surroundings had a notable concentration of Aromanians, including from other regions.

The town lost much of its Ottoman and medieval buildings in the early 20th century, particularly after it was rebuilt to a modern urban plan in the 1930s.

Trikala today is a vibrant greek city, well known throughout Greece for its river that bisects the city center and also for the historic monuments and the picturesque old town.

Sights

 The archaeological site of Asklepieion of Trikke, the most significant and most ancient of Greece, according to Strabo.
 The Byzantine Castle, built by Justinian onto the acropolis of ancient Trikke in the 6th century AD. Later it was rebuilt by the Ottomans, who in the 17th century placed a huge clock tower, which was accompanied by a bell weighing . In 1936, another clock tower was placed and today remains the trademark of the city, while offers a panoramic view to the city.
 The Old Town of Trikala, which consists of the districts Varousi and Manavika. Varousi was a Christian district of Trikala during the Ottoman rule and is located at the foot of the fortress. Until 1930, this part of the city was considered as the noble district of Trikala and is now a conservation area, with a large number of traditional old buildings, built between 17th and 19th century, preserved until today. In this part are located the oldest churches of the city, built between the 14th and the 19th century, all very close to each other. Following the district Varousi up to the central square is the part of the city called Manavika, a neighborhood of the old town with a uniform picturesque architecture. Here are located some of the best restaurants, coffee shops, and  bars in town.
 The Greek Orthodox Churches of Trikala. The oldest churches of the city are located mainly in the old town, within the Varousi historic district. Those churches are: Church of Virgin Mary Faneromeni (1853), Church of Virgin Mary Episkepsi (1867), Saint Stephen Church (1882), Saint Paraskevi Church (1843), Saint Marina Church (1766), Saint Demetrius Church (1588), Church of Saints Anargyroi (renovated in 1575), Saint John the Baptist Chapel (1674), Church of Saint John the Merciful and Saint Panteleimon (14th C.) and the Saint Nicholas Cathedral. Other historic churches can be also found in many other parts of the city.
 The Hill of Prophitis Ilias (Prophet Elijah), a grove with a nice panoramic view of the city and within walking distance from the city center. On this hill is situated the church of the Prophet Elijah (built in 1897) and the municipal zoo.
 Lithaios river that bisects the city center being its renowned landmark and the Central Bridge, built in 1886, which connects the central square with the main pedestrian street.
 The Mill of Matsopoulos, which was constructed in 1884 and today is a historical-industrial building being used as a museum and cultural center. During the Christmas period, the stone-built Matsopoulos Mill transforms into the “Mill of Elves”, Greece's most famous Christmas park.
 The Osman Shah Mosque (16th century), building designed by Mimar Sinan. Behind the mosque stands the mausoleum of Osman Shah, nephew of Sultan Suleyman the Magnificent.
 The Twin Ottoman bath (Hammam of Osman Shah). Built in the 16th century and probably designed by Mimar Sinan, underwent many changes and different uses throughout its history. The Twin Ottoman bath has been recently restored and nowadays is being used as a museum.
 The Kal Yavanim Synagogue, constructed between 1925 and 1931. It has been repaired in 1948 (women gallery was added), in 1955-56, in 2020 and was inaugurated in October 2022.
 The Trikala Train Station, built in 1886, the Courthouse and many more historical and neoclassical buildings.

Administration
The municipality Trikala was formed at the 2011 local government reform by the merger of the following 8 former municipalities, that became municipal units:
Estiaiotida
Faloreia
Kallidendro
Koziakas
Megala Kalyvia
Paliokastro
Paralithaioi
Trikala

The municipality has an area of 607.585 km2, the municipal unit 69.205 km2.

Province
The province of Trikala was one of the provinces of the Trikala Prefecture. Its territory corresponded with that of the current municipalities Trikala, Farkadona and Pyli. It was abolished in 2006.

Climate

Trikala's continental influence isn't enough for the city to avoid being classified as a Mediterranean climate (Csa), although with significant diurnal temperature variation. Meanwhile, autumn and spring are quite mild, lacking extremely low or high temperatures. Freezing temperatures occur sporadically, especially during winter nights. Occasional snowfall is observed but is generally not significant.

Infrastructure
Trikala is home to the General Hospital of the Trikala Prefecture. The Physical Education and Sport Science department of the University of Thessaly is also located in Trikala, and was founded in 1994, with the first students being admitted in the academic year 1994-1995; it was originally housed in the Matsopoulos Park facility, but moved to the new Karyes campus in July 1999. Trikala has over 20 schools of secondary education, and a modern night technical school also functions in the town.

Trikala has the distinction of being the first smart city in Greece, integrating new technologies into the daily life of the municipality and providing government services to citizens by means of e-governance. Furthermore, it is in the process of becoming Greece's first 5G-ready city.

Transport
The city is served by a railway station. There are daily basis train connection to Athens. The city also served by  E65 highway and Ktel busses.

Sporting teams

Trikala F.C., a football team that competed in the Greek first division, as recently as the 1999–00 season.
Trikala 2000 B.C., a basketball team that competed in the Greek top division, in the 2008–09 and 2009–10 seasons. The team was dismantled following the team's relegation from the top division, and ensuing financial difficulties.
Aries Trikala B.C., a basketball team that competed in the Greek top division for five seasons in a row (from 2013–14 till 2017–18. By season 2018-19 Aries Trikala B.C. will participate in the Greek A2 Basket League.

Twin towns - sister cities

Trikala is twinned with:

 Amberg, Germany
 Antiparos, Greece
 Banan (Chongqing), China

 Castrop-Rauxel, Germany
 Dropull, Albania
 Pyatigorsk, Russia
 Talence, France
 Tucson, United States
 Vranje, Serbia

Historical population

Notable people
Asclepius (about 1247 BC) God of medicine in ancient Greek religion and mythology
Oecumenius (about 990) Bishop of Trikka (now Trikkala)
Evangelos Averoff (1910–1990) politician
Stefanos Sarafis (1890-1957) major General in EAM-ELAS
Sotirios Kyrgiakos (1979) footballer
Dimitris Mitropanos (1948–2012) singer
Christos Papanikolaou (1941) pole vaulter
Efthimios Rentzias (1976) basketball player
Vassilis Tsitsanis (1915–1984) songwriter and singer
Ioannis Kellas (1908–1966) aviator
Sofia Sakorafa (1957) javelin's thrower, politician
Georgios Koltsidas (1970) footballer
Dimitrios Sgouros (1969) pianist
Gregory Kotrotsios (1984) professional basketball player
Kostas Papanikolaou (1990) basketball player
Stefanos Paparounas (1990) diver
Achilles Cholevas, father of Greek footballer José Holebas
Kostas Fortounis (1993) footballer
Vasilis Gregoriou (1965), Greek chemist, researcher, Director & Chairman of NHRF
Turhan Pasha Përmeti Former prime minister of Albania.
Christos Christou M.D., international president of Médecins Sans Frontières (MSF).

See also
Meteora
Porta Panagia
Pertouli

References

Additional reading
 Messinas, Elias. (2022). The Synagogues of Greece: A Study of Synagogues in Macedonia and Thrace: With Architectural Drawings of all Synagogues of Greece. KDP, 190.

External links

Trikala local portal
City of Trikala
Trikala wi-fi Internet coverage

 
Greek prefectural capitals
Municipalities of Thessaly
Provinces of Greece
Populated places in Trikala (regional unit)
Aromanian settlements in Greece